was a  after Shōwa and before Gen'ō. This period spanned the years from February 1317 to April 1319.

Change of era
 1317: The new era name was created to mark an event or series of events. The previous era ended and the new one commenced in Shōwa 6. The name was taken from the Book of Liang (AD 635) and means "elegant protection."

Events of the Bunpō era
During this era, Negotiations between the Bakufu and the two lines resulted in an agreement to alternate the throne between the two lines every 10 years (the Bunpō Agreement). This agreement did not last very long, being broken by Emperor Go-Daigo.
 1317 (Bunpō 1, 9th month): Former-Emperor Fushimi died at age 53 years.
 1318 (Bunpō 2, 2nd month): In the 11th year of Hanazono-tennōs reign (花園天皇11年), the emperor abdicated; and the succession (senso) was received by his cousin, the second son of former-Emperor Go-Uda. Shortly thereafter, Emperor Go-Daigo is said to have acceded to the throne (sokui).
 1319 (Bunpō 3, 4th month): Emperor Go-Daigo caused the nengō to be changed to Gen'ō to mark the beginning of his reign.

Notes

References
 Nussbaum, Louis-Frédéric and Käthe Roth. (2005).  Japan encyclopedia. Cambridge: Harvard University Press. ;  OCLC 58053128
 Titsingh, Isaac. (1834). Nihon Ōdai Ichiran; ou,  Annales des empereurs du Japon.  Paris: Royal Asiatic Society, Oriental Translation Fund of Great Britain and Ireland. OCLC 5850691
 Varley, H. Paul. (1980). A Chronicle of Gods and Sovereigns: Jinnō Shōtōki of Kitabatake Chikafusa. New York: Columbia University Press. ;  OCLC 6042764

External links
 National Diet Library, "The Japanese Calendar" -- historical overview plus illustrative images from library's collection

Japanese eras
1310s in Japan